An assassination attempt was made upon Leonid Brezhnev on 22 January 1969, when a deserter from the Soviet Army, Viktor Ilyin, fired shots at a motorcade carrying the Soviet leader through Moscow. Though Brezhnev was unhurt, the shots killed a driver and lightly injured several celebrated cosmonauts of the Soviet space program who were present in the motorcade. Brezhnev's attacker was captured and a news blackout on the event was maintained by the Soviet government for years thereafter.

Would-be assassin
Viktor Ivanovich Ilyin ( was born in Leningrad in 1947. After his graduation from a technical college, he was inducted into the Soviet Army in 1968 at the rank of lieutenant. Ilyin was said to have been resentful of his forced conscription and distressed by the Soviet invasion of Czechoslovakia.

On 21 January 1969, Ilyin stole two standard-issue Makarov handguns and deserted his army unit. He went back to his family in Leningrad where he stole his brother-in-law's authentic police uniform. Ilyin then left on an unannounced, solitary journey to Moscow.

Cosmonauts' motorcade

Dressed as a policeman, Ilyin moved unimpeded through a large crowd waiting at the Kremlin. They were clustered at the Borovitsky Gate, where a special motorcade was expected to pass: it would be bearing the successful cosmonauts of Soyuz 4 and Soyuz 5 to an important official ceremony.

The spaceflight crewmembers—Vladimir Shatalov, Boris Volynov, Yevgeny Khrunov, and Aleksei Yeliseyev—had returned only a week earlier from their historic manned-ship-to-manned-ship docking mission in space, the first of its kind. Arriving at Vnukovo Airport, they were being driven with Brezhnev and Soviet head of state Nikolai Podgorny to their commemorative celebration inside the Kremlin's Palace of Congresses. The four honorees rode in an open convertible at the front of the line, waving to spectators while a line of closed limousines trailed behind them.

Assassination attempt
At 2:15 p.m. on 22 January 1969, as the motorcade passed through the gate, Ilyin drew pistols in both hands. Ignoring the waving cosmonauts, he opened fire on the second car in the line: he later admitted that he only assumed it carried Brezhnev, but this ZiL limousine was filled only with other cosmonauts from earlier missions: Alexei Leonov, Valentina Tereshkova, Georgy Beregovoy, and Andriyan Nikolayev.

Ilyin's shots struck the limousine fourteen times, killing the driver, Ilya Zharkov, before a guard ran Ilyin down with his motorcycle. The other occupants of the car were unscathed or suffered only superficial wounds. After Ilyin was arrested, the cosmonauts' ceremony took place as planned, slightly delayed.

Aftermath

Ilyin underwent a lengthy interrogation led by KGB chief and future Soviet leader Yuri Andropov. During his interrogation, the recording of which was found in the Russian State Archives after 1991, Ilyin told Andropov that his motivation to assassinate Brezhnev was to have him replaced with his Second Secretary and Party Ideologue Mikhail Suslov (whom Ilyin called "the most outstanding person in the party at the moment"). Whether this was true or if he was simply trying to provoke infighting within the Politburo remains unknown. He was pronounced insane and sent to Kazan Psychiatric Hospital where he was kept in solitary confinement until 1988.

According to Russian sources, Ilyin was released in 1990 and moved to Saint Petersburg. The bullet-holed limousine has been preserved and is occasionally put on public exhibition.

Legacy
News was scant and slow to emerge. An official Soviet press statement was made two days after the shooting, but did not say if the shooter was a man or a woman. However, even without official confirmation, the event was seen as an assassination attempt on Brezhnev.

Years later, the cosmonaut Leonov recounted how Brezhnev confided to him after the incident: "Those bullets were not meant for you, Alexei. They were meant for me, and for that I apologize." But until the dissolution of the Soviet Union the KGB released little information about the shooting. The entire incident was "so effectively hushed up" that it was sometimes cited by Western observers as an example of Soviet secrecy.

References

1969 crimes in Russia
1969 in the Soviet Union
Brezhnev
Brezhnev
Crime in the Soviet Union
Assassination attempt
1969 in Moscow
Crime in Moscow
January 1969 events in Europe
Soviet cover-ups
Alexei Leonov